Toys "R" Us Canada Ltd. is a Canadian chain of toy stores. It was founded the Canadian franchise of U.S. toy retail chain Toys "R" Us, however as of 2018, it operates independently and is based in Concord, Ontario. 

It was owned by its American parent company from 1984 to 2018. In September 2017,  Toys "R" Us filed for Chapter 11 bankruptcy protection, and closed all U.S. locations in March 2018. Toys "R" Us pursued a sale of the Canadian division, including the possibility of bundling them with top-performing U.S. stores. The Canadian unit had annual sales of $1.08 billion at the time of the filing, and had to file for protection from its creditors due to the default of its U.S.-based businesses.

In April 2018, it was announced that Fairfax Financial would acquire the 82 Toys "R" Us locations in Canada for $300 million, with the stores continuing to use the Toys "R" Us name. In 2021, Sunrise Records owner Doug Putman, through his Putman Investments, announced he would buy Toys "R" Us Canada (which now comprised 81 locations) from Fairfax Financial.

References

1984 establishments in Ontario
Retail companies established in 1984
Toy companies established in 1984
Canadian companies established in 1984
Companies that have filed for bankruptcy in Canada
2018 mergers and acquisitions
Toys "R" Us
Toy retailers of Canada
Companies based in Vaughan
Fairfax Financial
Canadian subsidiaries of foreign companies